Olten railway station is a major hub railway station in the canton of Solothurn, Switzerland, at the junction of lines to Zürich, Bern, Basel, Lucerne and Biel. As a result, Olten is a railway town and was also the site of the main workshop of the Swiss Central Railway, which became a major workshop for the Swiss Federal Railways (SBB CFF FFS). It is the southern terminus of the Basel Regional S-Bahn S3 and S9 lines, the northern terminus of the Lucerne S-Bahn S8 line, and the western terminus of the Aargau S-Bahn S26 line.

Although Olten only has 18,000 inhabitants, the station is used each day by about 80,000 passengers and is one of the 10 busiest in Switzerland, busier than even Geneva. It serves 1,100 trains a day, making it one of the busiest in Switzerland.

Services
As a major railway junction, Olten serves numerous through trains. In addition, a number of local services originate at Olten:

Most northbound trains terminate in Basel; a single EuroCity continues to Hamburg-Altona, another to Frankfurt (Main) Hauptbahnhof, and two ICEs continue to Berlin Ostbahnhof.
 RegioExpress:
 Aargau S-Bahn:
 : hourly service to Rotkreuz.
 Basel trinational S-Bahn:
 : half-hourly service to Laufen and hourly service to Porrentruy.
 : hourly service to Sissach.

See also

History of rail transport in Switzerland
Rail transport in Switzerland

References

External links

 
 Interactive station plan (Olten)

Railway stations in the canton of Solothurn
Swiss Federal Railways stations
Olten
Railway stations in Switzerland opened in 1856